Belgian Bowl XIX was played in 2006 and was won by the West Flanders Tribes, this was their third Championship title. This title will be the first in their five time winning streak in the Belgian Bowl.

Playoffs
The 2 teams that play in the Belgian Bowl are the winners of the Belgian Bowl playoffs.

References

External links
Official Belgian Bowl website

American football in Belgium
Belgian Bowl
Belgian Bowl